Jodi Rudoren (born November 30, 1970) is an American journalist and Editor-in-Chief of The Forward.

Bibliography
Rudoren was a reporter and editor for The New York Times for many years, and was the newspaper's Bureau chief in Jerusalem from 2012 through 2015. She joined the masthead as Associate Managing Editor for Audience Strategy in 2018. She had previously been the Times''' Chicago bureau chief, a Times correspondent on the 2004 presidential campaign, and served as deputy editor on the Metro desk, where she created the Sunday Metropolitan section.  Rudoren was executive producer of the multimedia series One in 8 Million, which won an Emmy Award. She was named Editor-in-Chief of The Forward'' in July 2019 and assumed the role in September 2019.

Rudoren began her career under the byline Jodi Wilgoren, her birth name. She married the former Gary Ruderman in 2004 and in 2006 the two merged their surnames.

Rudoren was raised in Newton, Massachusetts and graduated cum laude from Yale University in 1992 where she was Managing Editor of Yale Daily News. She is a resident of Montclair, New Jersey. She serves on the board for the Fuller Project, a nonprofit journalism organization that reports on the issues that most impact women in the US and abroad.

References

1970 births
Living people
20th-century American journalists
21st-century American journalists
Jewish American journalists
The New York Times writers
The New York Times editors
20th-century American women writers
21st-century American women writers
American newspaper editors
Women newspaper editors
American women journalists
People from Montclair, New Jersey
21st-century American Jews